Laurence Crane (born 1961 in Oxford) is a composer of contemporary classical music.

Career 
Laurence Crane is closely associated with the ensemble Apartment House, who have given over 40 performances of his works. Some performances they have given include Riis (1996) and John White in Berlin (2003).

He has written a considerable amount of piano music. Pianists who have performed his work include Michael Finnissy, Thalia Myers and John Tilbury.

His piece Octet was shortlisted for the 2009 Royal Philharmonic Society Music Awards in the Chamber-Scale Composition category, along with works by Harrison Birtwistle and Karlheinz Stockhausen. In 2017, he won the Paul Hamlyn Foundation Awards for Artists 2017. In the same year, his piece Omloop Het Ives for bass flute and string quartet was nominated for the British Composer Awards.

In 2021, Juliet Fraser, in association with Oxford Lieder Festival and Musica Sacra Maastricht, commissioned Crane to write a new piece that responds to the work of marine biologist Rachel Carson. The commission, Natural World for soprano and piano/sampler keyboard, won the Small Chamber Ivor Novello Award in 2022. Commenting on the piece, the jury added that "the composer has carefully chosen every note resulting in a beautifully placed and slowly evolving piece that is contemplative without losing momentum".

He is currently Professor of Composition at the Guildhall School of Music and Drama.

Compositional style 
A 1995 Gramophone review described Crane's music as "as minimal as you can get, and irresistibly droll".

In the program for a concert in Oslo, Norway in April 2013, Crane writes that "I use simple and basic musical objects; common chords and intervals, arpeggios, drones, cadences, fragments of scales and melodies. The materials may seem familiar - perhaps even rather ordinary - but my aim is to find a fresh beauty in these objects by placing them in new structural and formal contexts..."

Personal life 
Laurence Crane was born in 1961 in Oxford. He read music at the University of Nottingham with Peter Nelson and Nigel Osborne.

His brother is the philosopher Tim Crane.

Notable Works 
 John White in Berlin
 20th Century Music
 Raimondas Rumsas
 Pieces About Art
 Sparling
 Holt Quartet
 Old Life was Rubbish
 Sound of Horse
 Slow Folk Tune: Sheringham
 Cobbled Section After Cobbled Section
 See Our Lake
 Birthday piece for Michael Finnissy

References

External links
 BBC 3 programme featuring the composer, accessed 6 February 2010

1961 births
Living people
20th-century classical composers
21st-century classical composers
English classical composers
English male classical composers
20th-century English composers
21st-century English composers
20th-century British male musicians
21st-century British male musicians